(The) Last Man on Earth may refer to:

 Last Man on Earth (1982 book), science fiction anthology edited by Isaac Asimov
 Last Man on Earth (album), a 2001 album by Loudon Wainwright III
 "The Last Man on Earth" (song), a 2021 song by Wolf Alice from their album Blue Weekend
 The Last Man on Earth (1924 film), a silent comedy film
 The Last Man on Earth (1964 film), an Italian science fiction starring Vincent Price
 The Last Man on Earth (2011 film), an Italian science fiction film by Gipi
 The Last Man on Earth (TV series), a 2015 American comedy television series

See also
The Last Man on Planet Earth, a 1999 television movie
Y: The Last Man, a science fiction comic book series
Last Woman on Earth, 1960 science fiction film
Last One on Earth, 1992 album
The Last Man (disambiguation)